Vanidades (Spanish for Vanities) is one of the most popular Spanish language women's magazines. Published by Editorial Televisa across the United States and Hispanic America, it was launched in Cuba in February 1937 by Editorial Carteles S.A. When Fidel Castro rose to power, Vanidades''' headquarters moved from Havana to New York. Later, in 1961, Vanidades was relaunched as Nueva Vanidades and eventually as Vanidades Continental.

The magazine in its beginnings was aimed at women of high class, addressing them in a friendly manner and serving as a guide to help them keep up with the trends in fashion, culture, arts, health and beauty. To guarantee its market success, the magazine is edited locally in some cases, blending national preferences with international trends and always following its traditionally classical style.

The main headquarters of Vanidades'' are now located in Mexico. However, localized editions are released simultaneously in Argentina, Chile, Bolivia, Colombia, Ecuador, Peru, Brazil, United States, Puerto Rico and the Dominican Republic.

Vanidades magazine stopped circulating in Colombia, Peru, Ecuador, Chile and Argentina due to the closure of Editorial Televisa in those countries between January and February 2019. It was also distributed in Venezuela through the Bloque Dearmas, but it stopped being published due to the socioeconomic crisis that is lived in that country.

References

External links
  Official website of Vanidades magazine
  Vanidades USA website
  VA step towards creative excellence

Magazines established in 1931
Magazines published in Cuba
Magazines published in Mexico
Monthly magazines published in Mexico
Spanish-language magazines
Women's fashion magazines
Women's magazines